The Edgewater Public Library is located at 48 Hudson Avenue in Edgewater, in Bergen County, New Jersey, United States.

Serving a population of 7,677, the library in 2011 included a collection of 20,402 volumes. As a member of the Bergen County Cooperative Library System, a consortium of municipal libraries in the northeastern New Jersey counties of Bergen, Hudson, Passaic, and Essex, it has a circulation of 52,627 items per year.

The building is one of New Jersey's 36 Carnegie libraries, constructed with a grant of $15,000 made March 16, 1915 by the Carnegie Corporation and opened in 1916. Engraved about its entrance is Edgewater Free Library. In 2009, the library was listed on the state and national registers of historic places.

See also
List of Carnegie libraries in New Jersey
Edgewater Borough Hall
National Register of Historic Places listings in Bergen County, New Jersey

References

External links 
Edgewater Public Library
Bergen County Coopertaive Library System

Library buildings completed in 1916
Edgewater, New Jersey
Carnegie libraries in New Jersey
Buildings and structures in Bergen County, New Jersey
Neoclassical architecture in New Jersey
New Jersey Register of Historic Places
Public libraries in New Jersey